Krzywe may refer to the following places:
Krzywe, Brzozów County in Subcarpathian Voivodeship (south-east Poland)
Krzywe, Ełk County in Warmian-Masurian Voivodeship (north Poland)
Krzywe, Giżycko County in Warmian-Masurian Voivodeship (north Poland)
Krzywe Koło-Kolonia (north Poland)
Krzywe Kolano (north Poland)
Krzywe Koło (north Poland)
Krzywe Lake (north east Poland)
Krzywe, Lesko County in Subcarpathian Voivodeship (south-east Poland)
Krzywe, Lubaczów County in Subcarpathian Voivodeship (south-east Poland)
Krzywe, Lublin Voivodeship (east Poland)
Nowe Krzywe (north Poland)
Krzywe, Podlaskie Voivodeship (north-east Poland)
Stare Krzywe (north east Poland)
Krzywe, Mrągowo County in Warmian-Masurian Voivodeship (north Poland)
Krzywe, Olecko County in Warmian-Masurian Voivodeship (north Poland)